The Bani Israel Graveyard is the only Jewish cemetery in Karachi, Sindh, Pakistan. This cemetery is a part of the larger Mewa Shah Graveyard. Over the years, the area has been reduced. The graveyard currently holds about 5,000 graves.

In his book ‘Karachi Tareekh Ke Aaeene Mein’ (Karachi in the Mirror of History), Muhammad Usman Damohi writes that the Jews only had one cemetery in Karachi, located south-east of the Haji Camp area. It was called the Bani Israel Cemetery. In her book ‘Malika-e-Mashriq’ (Queen of the East), Mehmooda Rizwiya writes that the Old Jewish Cemetery is adjacent to Usmanabad and is in the south-east of the Haji Camp.

Notable burials
 Solomon David, an official of the Karachi Municipal Corporation and according to some the builder of the Magain Shalome Synagogue

See also
 List of cemeteries in Karachi

References

External links
 Cemeteries in Karachi during British Raj
 Karachi's Jewish cemetery in dire need of repair
 

Cemeteries in Karachi
Jewish cemeteries
Jews and Judaism in Pakistan